William de Braose, (alias  Breuse,  Brewes,  Brehuse,  Briouze,  Brewose etc.; –1291)  was the first Baron Braose, as well as Lord of Gower and Lord of Bramber.

Family and early life
Braose was the son of John de Braose, the Lord of Bramber and Gower and John's wife Margaret, the daughter of Llywelyn the Great, prince of Gwynedd. These members of the Braose family were all descendants of William de Braose, who died around 1093 and was the Domesday tenant of Bramber. His family had its origins at Briouze in Normandy.

Braose's  father was dead in 1232, before 18 July, when William became lord of his father's properties. William came of age before 15 July 1245, making his birth around 1224.

Lord and baron
He served King Henry III of England and Henry's son Edward I as a councilor and in various councils. He sided with King Henry against Simon de Montfort during the civil war in England in the later part of Henry's reign.

Braose was a benefactor of Sele Priory, with surviving charters recording the grant of a large estate in Crockhurst, Sussex to the priory in 1254. The charter was dated 4 January 1254, and was in exchange for 10 marks as an annual rent from the priory. Another charter records the gift of land near the road from Chichester to Bramber that was made at the urging of his mother Margaret. Other benefactions included gifs of rents and two small gifts of land. Around 1280, Braose released the priory from performing certain customary services and rents that it had previously paid to him and his ancestors.

Marriages, death, and legacy
Braose married three times. His first wife was Aline, daughter of Thomas de Multon. His second was Agnes, daughter of Nicholas de Moeles. His third wife was Mary, daughter of Robert de Ros. He died at Findon in Sussex shortly before 6 January 1291. He was buried at Sele Priory in Sussex on 15 January.

Braose's son, William de Braose, 2nd Baron Braose, by his first wife, succeeded him. By his second wife, he had a son Giles, who was knighted and fought in Scotland in 1300. By his third wife, William had at least three children – Richard, Peter, and Margaret (wife of Ralph de Camoys, 1st Baron Camoys) – and possibly a fourth – William. Richard was dead before 9 February 1296, and Peter died before 7 February 1312.

Notes

Citations

References

 
 
 
 
 
 

Anglo-Normans in Wales
Norman warriors
Barons Braose (first creation)
1291 deaths
Year of birth unknown
13th-century Welsh nobility
People from Findon, West Sussex